Lomnitz may refer to:

People
Cinna Lomnitz (1925–2016), Chilean-Mexican geophysicist 
Claudio Lomnitz, Mexican professor of Anthropology
Larissa Adler Lomnitz (1932-2019), French-born Chilean-Mexican social anthropologist, researcher, professor, and academic

Places
Lomnitz, the German name of some inhabited places:
 Lomnice (disambiguation) (Czech language)
 Łomnica (disambiguation) (Polish language)